Pier Luigi Carafa  (Senior) (18 July 1581, Naples, Italy – 15 February 1655, Rome, during the conclave) was a cardinal of the Catholic Church, and a member of the Roman Curia.

Biography
He was bishop of Tricarico and nuntius of Cologne. On 2 June 1624, he was consecrated bishop by Cosimo de Torres, Cardinal-Priest of San Pancrazio, with Giovanni Antonio Angrisani, Archbishop of Sorrento, and Alessandro Suardi, Bishop of Lucera, serving as co-consecrators.

He was made cardinal in March 1645 by Pope Innocent X. He died during the 1655 papal conclave.

Other cardinals in the same family were Filippo Carafa della Serra (created 1378), Oliviero Carafa (created 1467), Carlo Carafa (1555), Diomede Carafa (1555), Alfonso Carafa (1557), Antonio Carafa (1568), Decio Carafa (1611), Carlo Carafa della Spina (1664), Fortunato Ilario Carafa della Spina (1686), Pierluigi Carafa (1728), Francesco Carafa della Spina di Traetto (1773), Marino Carafa di Belvedere (1801), and Domenico Carafa della Spina di Traetto (1844).

Episcopal succession
While bishop, he was the principal consecrator of:

and the principal co-consecrator of:
Miguel Juan Balaguer Camarasa, Bishop of Malta (1635);
Domenico Ravenna, Bishop of Nicastro (1635); and
Luigi Pappacoda, Bishop of Capaccio (1635).

References

External links and additional sources
 (for Chronology of Bishops) 
 (for Chronology of Bishops) 

Bishops in Basilicata
17th-century Italian cardinals
1581 births
1655 deaths
Apostolic Nuncios to Cologne
Pier